Bacterioplanes sanyensis is a Gram-negative bacterium from the genus of Bacterioplanes which has been isolated from a pool with cyanobacteria Spirulina plantensis in Sanya in China.

References

Oceanospirillales
Bacteria described in 2016